The following is a complete list of episodes for the British sitcom Goodnight Sweetheart. The programme premiered on BBC1 on 18 November 1993, and originally ran for six series; which concluded on 28 June 1999. However, a one-off special episode aired on 2 September 2016, on BBC One.

The show was written and created by Laurence Marks and Maurice Gran, who wrote the complete first series of the show, after which they only wrote some episodes, along with a team of writers. The creators also wrote the final episode of the show, where Gary Sparrow finds he is trapped in 1945 with Phoebe. In an interview, the pair commented that Gary couldn't always have his cake and eat it.

Series overview

Episodes

Series 1 (1993)

Series 2 (1995)

Special (1995)

Series 3 (1996)

Series 4 (1997)

Series 5 (1998)

Series 6 (1999)

Special (2016)

References

External links
 List of 
 
 

BBC-related lists
Lists of British romance television series episodes
Lists of British science fiction television series episodes
Lists of British sitcom episodes